William Buckels, also known as Willem Beuckel, Willem Beuckelsz  or William Buckelsson, and sometimes Willem Beuckelszoon by the Dutch, was a 14th-century fisherman from Biervliet, Zeeland, whose discovery of gibbing, a preservation process for herring, led to the Dutch becoming a maritime power.

Buckels has been recognized as a Dutch National Hero for his accomplishment from that day on. Now called Willem Bueckelszoon by the Netherlands Board of Tourism and Conventions, on September 9, 1886 the Pall Mall Budget featured an article (pictured at right) marking the 500th Anniversary (fifth centenary) of William Buckels' discovery that "salt fish will keep, and that fish that can be kept can be packed and can be exported". It was reprinted in The New York Times later that month. In 1386 William Buckels salted and packed (into barrels) the first hundred herring ultimately leading to Holland's monopoly in a new market which was subsequently created by Buckels' discovery. Holland and especially Amsterdam, said to be "built on Herring bones", reaped great wealth from its herring fishery in subsequent years, made possible by its ability to preserve fish through Buckel's process.

The process that Buckels discovered (and is accredited with the invention of) is known as 'gibbing'. The gills and part of the gullet of the fish are removed eliminating any bitter taste, and the liver and pancreas are left in the fish during salt-curing, releasing enzymes that flavour the fish. After the fish is initially prepared by gill and gullet removal, it is put into barrels for curing with a 1:20 ratio of salt to herring.

Following his discovery, the Dutch began to build ships to transport salted herring to export markets, which eventually led to  becoming a seafaring nation.

In the 1807 work The Naturalist's Cabinet, the author identifies Buckels' name as the etymological source of the English word pickle. However, the Oxford English Dictionary provides "Middle Dutch pēkel, pēkele, (Dutch pekel)" and other language cognates, and does not mention Buckels.

The ending -sz in Beuckelsz is a patronimic, meaning 'son of Beuckel'.

References

14th-century introductions
14th-century people of the Holy Roman Empire
Dutch fishers
14th-century inventors
People from Terneuzen